Andrine Tomter (born 5 February 1995) is a Norwegian football defender who plays for Vålerenga in the Norwegian Toppserien and the Norway national team.

Club career

Tomter began playing in the boys' teams at her local club Drøbak-Frogn, then joined Kolbotn aged 13. She progressed into Kolbotn's Toppserien team before signing a three-year contract with Avaldsnes in December 2015.

In August 2017, she signed a year contract with Dutch Eredivisie club FC Twente. In August 2018 she went back to Norway and Vålerenga.

International career

Tomter won 39 caps for Norway from under-15 to under-19 level. She made her senior debut in January 2014, a 2–1 friendly win over Spain at La Manga Stadium. A serious knee injury meant Tomter could not play at the 2015 FIFA Women's World Cup, but she returned to the national team for the UEFA Women's Euro 2017 qualifying series.

References

External links
 

1995 births
Living people
People from Frogn
Sportspeople from Viken (county)
Norwegian women's footballers
Norway women's youth international footballers
Norway women's international footballers
Toppserien players
Eredivisie (women) players
Kolbotn Fotball players
Avaldsnes IL players
FC Twente (women) players
Vålerenga Fotball Damer players
Women's association football defenders
Norwegian expatriate women's footballers
Expatriate women's footballers in the Netherlands
Norwegian expatriate sportspeople in the Netherlands